Adam Marc Bacher (born 29 October 1973) is a South African cricketer. He is a right-handed batsman and a right-arm medium-pace bowler. He is the nephew of former South African captain and cricket chief Ali Bacher.

Biography
Bacher entered South African cricket in 1995/96 in the Under-24 side which toured Sri Lanka and made his Test debut against India at the back end of the following year. Having had a mostly unsuccessful start to the season, his form picked up in Australia where he put in an innings of 96. He continued to impress for the next two years, but after poor form against England and the West Indies, he spent seven years out of one day cricket. He is best remembered for a spectacular catch he took while fielding deep to remove Sachin Tendulkar in the 1996 test series against India.

Bacher was picked once again in 2005 for an English One Day International, but he only played the first game of the one day series, and was dropped thereafter.

See also
 List of select Jewish cricketers

External links
 
 

1973 births
Lithuanian Jews
Living people
Alumni of King Edward VII School (Johannesburg)
South African cricketers
Jewish cricketers
South African Jews
South Africa One Day International cricketers
South Africa Test cricketers
Cape Cobras cricketers
Gauteng cricketers
Lions cricketers
Maccabiah Games medalists in cricket
Maccabiah Games gold medalists for South Africa
Cricketers from Johannesburg
Commonwealth Games medallists in cricket
Commonwealth Games gold medallists for South Africa
Cricketers at the 1998 Commonwealth Games
Jewish South African sportspeople
Medallists at the 1998 Commonwealth Games